Marinobacterium mangrovicola  is a nitrogen-fixing, Gram-negative and motile bacterium from the genus of Marinobacterium which has been isolated from the roots of the mangrove Rhizophora mangle from an aquarium in Germany.

References

 

Alteromonadales
Bacteria described in 2014